Star Kıbrıs (Star Cyprus) is a daily newspaper published in Northern Cyprus. It was established in 2007 by Ali Özmen Safa.

See also 
 List of newspapers in Northern Cyprus

References 

Newspapers published in Northern Cyprus
Publications established in 2007